HMS Union was a 90-gun second rate ship of the line of the Royal Navy, built at Chatham Dockyard to the draught specified by the 1745 Establishment as amended in 1750, and launched on 25 September 1756.

In 1756, one of the midshipmen on the Union was John Hunter, later to become an admiral and the second Governor of New South Wales. On 1 August 1757 Arthur Phillip, who was to become the first Governor of New South Wales, joined the crew with the new commander.

The results (published in 1796) of an experiment made at the desire of the Lords Commissioners of the Admiralty, on board the Union hospital ship, to determine the effect of the nitrous acid in destroying contagion, and the safety with which it may be employed were given in a letter addressed to the Right Hon. Earl Spencer, by James Carmichael Smyth, M. D. F.R.S., Fellow of the Royal College of Physicians, and Physician Extraordinary to His Majesty, published with the approbation of the lords commissioners of the Admiralty.

In 1799, Union was converted to serve as a hospital ship.

In 1802 she was renamed Sussex. She remained a hospital and receiving ship until 1816, when the decision was taken to have her broken up.

Citations

References

Lavery, Brian (2003) The Ship of the Line – Volume 1: The development of the battlefleet 1650–1850. Conway Maritime Press. .

Ships of the line of the Royal Navy
1756 ships